Distal subungual onychomycosis is an infection of the nail plate by fungus, primarily involving the distal nail plate.

See also 
 Onychomycosis
 Skin lesion

References 

Mycosis-related cutaneous conditions